Swati Chaturvedi is an Indian journalist. She has worked for various Indian newspapers and channels, like The Statesman, The Indian Express, Hindustan Times, The Tribune, NDTV, DailyO, The Wire, Gulf News and Deccan Herald. She has also published two books; her first book is Daddy's Girl; her second book is titled I am a Troll: Inside the Secret World of the BJP's Digital Army. Swati Chaturvedi won the Prize for Courage, in 2018, awarded by Reporters Without Borders for journalism in a hostile environment.

See also
Barkha Dutt

References

External links
 Swati Chaturvedi at NDTV

Indian editors
Indian columnists
Living people
Indian women editors
Indian women columnists
Indian investigative journalists
Indian women journalists
21st-century Indian journalists
21st-century Indian women writers
21st-century Indian writers
Year of birth missing (living people)